Chaetostoma dorsale is a species of catfish in the family Loricariidae. It is native to South America, where it occurs in the basins of the Meta River and the Apure River. The species reaches 8.8 cm (3.5 inches) SL.

References 

dorsale
Fish described in 1922